Franklin T. McQuaide (September 2, 1887 - June 21, 1954) was a longtime Pittsburgh Police leader, who served as Pittsburgh Police Chief from 1933 until 1934 and again from Summer 1936-Spring 1939. He was then the head of the homicide division from 1939 until his retirement in 1944 when he became the Chief of Police at Kennywood, an amusement park in neighboring West Mifflin, Pennsylvania.

Before becoming chief, McQuaide joined the force as a detective in 1907. He also worked as the head of security at the William Penn Hotel and ran the McQuaide Detective Agency, founded by his father, Thomas A. McQuaide, from 1928 until he was chosen as Pittsburgh Police Chief in 1933. McQuaide lived with his wife, Eleanor Joyce McQuaide, and their nine children in the Mount Washington (Pittsburgh) neighborhood of Pittsburgh.

See also

 Police chief
 Allegheny County Sheriff
 List of law enforcement agencies in Pennsylvania

External links

References

 https://news.google.com/newspapers?nid=1144&dat=19330416&id=9b8aAAAAIBAJ&sjid=aksEAAAAIBAJ&pg=3372,5177893
 https://news.google.com/newspapers?nid=1129&dat=19440506&id=3aYkAAAAIBAJ&sjid=uGkDAAAAIBAJ&pg=1796,3280244

1887 births
1954 deaths
Chiefs of the Pittsburgh Bureau of Police